Events from the year 1675 in China.

Incumbents 
 Kangxi Emperor (14th year)

Events 
 The Revolt of the Three Feudatories continues
 Tuhai defeated Wang Fuchen in Pingliang, Gansu, and Wang Qiang fell, and Emperor Kangxi sinned.
 Chahar prince Abunai and  his brother Lubuzung revolt against the Qing in 1675 along with 3,000 Chahar Mongol followers. On April 20, 1675, Qing forces defeat the Chahar and kill Abunai and all his followers. Their title was abolished, all Chahar Mongol royal males were executed even if they were born to Manchu Qing princesses, and all Chahar Mongol royal females were sold into slavery except the Manchu Qing princesses. The Chahar Mongols were then put under the direct control of the Qing Emperor unlike the other Inner Mongol leagues which maintained their autonomy. 
 Kangxi's son Yunreng named Crown Prince
 Sino-Russian border conflicts

Deaths
 Wei Zhouzuo (衛周祚, 1612–1675), courtesy name Wenxi, art name Wenshi, was an official who served in the late Ming dynasty and early Qing dynasty.
 Sun Qifeng (1583–1675; 孫奇逢; Sun Ch'i-feng in Wade Giles) a native of Rongcheng County in Zhili Province. He passed the imperial examination for xiucai
 Mishan (1633–1675), served as the Minister of Revenue from 1669 to 1675, Grandfather of Empress Xiaoxianchun, consort to the Qianlong Emperor
 Burni, (1650-1675) Prince of the Chahar Mongols and son of Abunai

References

 
 .

 
China